The following events occurred in April 1978:

April 1, 1978 (Saturday)
New Zealand National Airways Corporation (the domestic airline of New Zealand) merged with New Zealand's international airline, Air New Zealand.
Dick Smith of Dick Smith Foods towed a fake iceberg to Sydney Harbour.
The Philippine College of Commerce, through a presidential decree, was converted to the Polytechnic University of the Philippines.
Freddy Maertens of Belgium won the 1978 E3 Prijs Vlaanderen cycle race.
Lucius won the 1978 Grand National horse race at Aintree Racecourse, near Liverpool, England. Rag Trade, the 1976 Grand National winner, pulled up at Fence 21 and was later euthanized.
At Richmond International Airport in Richmond, Virginia, a hijacker commandeered a Piedmont Airlines Boeing 737-200 bound for Norfolk, Virginia, with 66 people on board, and forced the plane to fly to New York City, where he was arrested.
Hans Tanzler, the mayor of Jacksonville, Florida, and pilot Bill Aldridge were only slightly injured in the crash of a small plane in Madison, Florida.
In Baton Rouge, Louisiana, five children between the ages of 4 months and 9 years died in a house fire after their mother left them alone to go grocery shopping. Firefighters delayed entering the house because they thought it was empty.
Born:
Maxime Agueh, French-Beninese footballer; in Lille, France
Jason Bell, National Football League cornerback and TV pundit; in Long Beach, California
Rune Berger (formerly known as Rune Johansen), Norwegian footballer and coach; in Tromsø, Norway
Jean-Pierre Dumont, Canadian professional ice hockey forward; in Montreal, Quebec, Canada
Rolandas Džiaukštas, Lithuanian footballer; in Vilnius, Lithuanian Soviet Socialist Republic, Soviet Union
Nawaf bin Faisal Al Saud, president of the Saudi Arabian Olympic Committee; in Ar-Riyad, Saudi Arabia
Mirka Federer (born Miroslava Vavrincová), Swiss professional tennis player, wife of Roger Federer; in Bojnice, Czechoslovakia
JJ Feild, British-American actor; in Denver, Colorado
Tom Harald Hagen, Norwegian football referee
Freddy Juarez, American soccer player and coach; in Las Cruces, New Mexico
Andrei Karyaka, Russian footballer and coach; in Dnipropetrovsk, Ukrainian Soviet Socialist Republic, Soviet Union
Anamaria Marinca, Romanian actress; in Iași, Romania
Antonio de Nigris, Mexican footballer; in Monterrey, Mexico (d. 2009)
Marco Rossi, Italian footballer; in Seravezza, Italy
Sébastien Roth, Swiss footballer; in Boncourt, Switzerland
Akram Roumani, Moroccan professional and Olympic footballer; in Fez, Morocco
Nico Sijmens, Belgian road racing cyclist; in Diest, Belgium
Etan Thomas, National Basketball Association player; in Harlem, Manhattan, New York City

April 2, 1978 (Sunday)
The 1978 Milan Indoor men's championship concluded at the Palasport di San Siro in Milan, Italy. Björn Borg won the singles title.
Jos Schipper of the Netherlands won the 1978 Dwars door België cycle race.
At the final of the 1978 Men's Hockey World Cup field hockey tournament in Buenos Aires, Argentina, Pakistan defeated the Netherlands by a score of 3–2.
A 2:50 am collision between a car and a van carrying a South Texas band home from an engagement killed seven people and left one in critical condition.
In Brownson, Nebraska, 30 of the 85 cars on a Union Pacific Railroad train derailed. A tank car full of liquid phosphorus then exploded, injuring three people. Over 500 people were evacuated.
Argentine driver Carlos Reutemann of the Scuderia Ferrari team won the 1978 United States Grand Prix West in Long Beach, California.
Police Officers Christie D. Masone and Norman R. Cerullo of the New York City Police Department were shot and killed after stopping two suspicious men in Brooklyn.
1978 Air Canada Silver Broom, the men's World Curling Championships, concluded at the Winnipeg Arena in Winnipeg, Manitoba, Canada. The championship was won by the United States.
Dallas debuted on CBS, and gave birth to the modern-day primetime soap opera.
Born:
Karim Belhocine, French footballer and manager; in Vénissieux, France
Nick Berg, American businessman; in West Chester, Pennsylvania (d. 2004)
Junior Fisher, Caymanian footballer; in Cayman Islands
John Hoyne, Irish Kilkenny hurler; in Ballycallan, County Kilkenny, Ireland
Scott Lynch, American fantasy author; in Saint Paul, Minnesota
Jaime Ray Newman, American actress; in Farmington Hills, Michigan
Deon Richmond, American actor; in Harlem, Manhattan, New York City
Silvia Salemi, Italian singer-songwriter and television personality; in Palazzolo Acreide, Syracuse, Sicily, Italy
Alberto Schiavon, Italian Olympic snowboarder; in Rovereto, Trentino, Italy
Griselda Siciliani, Argentine actress, singer and dancer; in Buenos Aires, Argentina
Chiel Warners, Dutch Olympic decathlete; in Harderwijk, Gelderland, Netherlands
Died:
Aurelio Baldor, 71, Cuban mathematician, educator and lawyer
Willi Kaidel, 65, German Olympic rower
Franco Pinna, 52, Italian neorealist photographer

April 3, 1978 (Monday)
Regular radio broadcasts of British Parliamentary proceedings began.
The 50th Academy Awards were held at the Dorothy Chandler Pavilion in Los Angeles, California, with Annie Hall winning Best Picture.
Born:
Tim Cornelisse, Dutch footballer; in Alkmaar, Netherlands
Golo (born Óscar Santor Martínez), Spanish footballer; in Vitoria-Gasteiz, Álava, Spain
Matthew Goode, English actor; in Exeter, Devon, England
Michael Gravgaard, Danish footballer; in Spentrup, Denmark
Tommy Haas, German professional and Olympic tennis player; in Hamburg, West Germany
Jillionaire (born Christopher Leacock), Trinidadian DJ and music producer
Luca Moncada, Italian rower
John Smit, South African rugby union player; in Pietersburg, Transvaal, South Africa
Raja Toumi, Tunisian handball player and coach; in Tunis, Tunisia
Jaquay Walls, National Basketball Association player; in Brooklyn, New York City
Died:
Karl Asplund, 87 or 88, Swedish poet, short story writer and art historian
Horst-Tanu Margraf, 74 or 75, German conductor
Kevin McAlinden, 64, Northern Irish Olympic footballer
Ray Noble, 74, English bandleader and composer
Winston Sharples, 69, American film composer

April 4, 1978 (Tuesday)
Cyclone Alby killed 5 people and caused wildfires that destroyed two towns in Western Australia.
Born:
Jason Ellison, Major League Baseball outfielder; in Quincy, California
Lemar (born Lemar Obika), English singer, songwriter and record producer; in Tottenham, North London, England
Alan Mahon, Irish footballer; in Dublin, Ireland
Sam Moran, Australian singer (The Wiggles); in Sydney, New South Wales, Australia
Sven Neuhaus, German footballer; in Essen, West Germany
Marcel Nkueni, Congolese footballer; in Kinshasa, Zaire
Irene Skliva, Greek model, Miss World 1996; in Athens, Greece
René Wolff, German Olympic and world champion track cyclist; in Erfurt, Thuringia, East Germany
Jurica Žuža, Croatian basketball player and coach; in Zadar, Socialist Republic of Croatia, Socialist Federal Republic of Yugoslavia
Died: Morien Morgan CB FRS, 65, Welsh aeronautical engineer

April 5, 1978 (Wednesday)
In Algiers, Algeria, mercenaries stabbed Canarian Independentist Antonio Cubillo in the hallway of his house, resulting in him becoming reliant on a wheelchair, in an assassination attempt linked to the Spanish government.
U.S. President Jimmy Carter gave an interview to Black Perspective, answering questions on his trip to Africa, national urban policy, support from African-Americans, his views on the presidency, reverse discrimination, the Humphrey-Hawkins bill, administration programs, foreign relations of the United States, and human rights.
Born:
Franziska van Almsick, German Olympic swimmer; in East Berlin, East Germany
Jérôme Arpinon, French football manager; in Nîmes, France
Dwain Chambers, British Olympic track sprinter; in London, England
Casper Elgaard, Danish racing driver
Yumie Funayama (born Yumie Hayashi), Japanese Olympic curler; in Tokoro, Hokkaido, Japan
Alfredo Galán, Spanish serial killer; in Puertollano, Province of Ciudad Real, Castilla–La Mancha, Spain
Robert Glasper, American pianist, record producer and songwriter; in Houston, Texas
Bernd Heidicker, German Olympic rower; in Recklinghausen, North Rhine-Westphalia, West Germany
Boussad Houche, Algerian-French footballer; in Revin, France
Stephen Jackson, American basketball player; in Houston, Texas
Marcone Amaral Costa, Qatari footballer; in Poções, Brazil
Stephen Murphy, Irish footballer; in Dublin, Ireland
Olek (artist) (born Agata Oleksiak), Polish artist; in Ruda Śląska, Poland
Jairo Patiño, Colombian footballer; in Cali, Colombia
Pedrão (born Christiano Florêncio da Silva), Brazilian footballer; in Jaboticabal, Brazil
Helgi Petersen, Faroese footballer; in Runavík, Faroe Islands
Tarek El-Said, Egyptian footballer; in Tanta, Egypt
Steinar Tenden, Norwegian footballer; in Stryn, Norway
Arnaud Tournant, French Olympic champion track cyclist; in Roubaix, France
Günther Weidlinger, Austrian Olympic long-distance runner; in Braunau am Inn, Austria
Died: Carlo Tagliabue, 80, Italian baritone

April 6, 1978 (Thursday)
28-year-old schoolteacher Leslie Barker was murdered in Akron, Ohio, between 3 a.m. and 5 a.m. after participating in a computerized dating activity at a bar the previous night. Barker's remains were found in the back seat of her car, which had been set on fire.  the case would remain unsolved.
U.S. President Carter named Colonel Margaret A. Brewer to become the first female general officer in the United States Marine Corps, as well as the Corps' first female director of information.
Fred Richmond, a member of the United States House of Representatives from New York, was arraigned in Washington, D.C. on a charge of soliciting sex from a 16-year-old boy.
The 1978 Masters Tournament began at Augusta National Golf Club in Augusta, Georgia. John Schlee of the United States was the leader after the first day.
Gene Leroy Hart was arrested in Adair County, Oklahoma, for the killing of three Girl Scouts at a summer camp on June 13, 1977. Hart would be acquitted of the murders on March 30, 1979.
Olympic gold medalist and former Dallas Cowboys wide receiver Bob Hayes and another man were arrested on drug charges in Addison, Texas.
Born:
Imani Coppola, American singer-songwriter and violinist; in New York City
Hany El-Fakharany, Egyptian Olympic handball player
Tim Hasselbeck, National Football League quarterback; in Norfolk, Massachusetts
Thomas Herschmiller, Canadian Olympic rower; in Comox, British Columbia, Canada
Myleene Klass, English singer, pianist, and model; in Great Yarmouth, Norfolk, England
Nicola Mayr, Italian Olympic speed skater; in Bolzano, Italy
Martín Méndez, Uruguayan musician and songwriter; in Montevideo, Uruguay
Blaine Neal, Major League Baseball relief pitcher; in Marlton, New Jersey
Valentina Pedicini, Italian film director and screenwriter; in Brindisi, Italy (d. 2020)
Fabiano Pereira, Brazilian professional and Olympic footballer; in Marília, São Paulo, Brazil
Stig Arild Råket, Norwegian footballer; in Kristiansund, Norway
Lauren Ridloff, American actress; in Chicago, Illinois
Igor Semshov, Russian footballer and coach; in Moscow, Russian Soviet Federative Socialist Republic, Soviet Union
Robert Tom, Vanuatu footballer
Levys Torres, Colombian Women's National Basketball Association player; in Barranquilla, Colombia
Daphny van den Brand, Dutch cyclo-cross, road bicycle and mountain bike racer; in Zeeland, North Brabant, Netherlands
Jaco van der Westhuyzen, South African rugby union player; in Nelspruit, South Africa
Died: Nicolas Nabokov, 74, Russian-American composer and writer

April 7, 1978 (Friday)

A partial solar eclipse was visible in parts of Antarctica and southern Africa.
Murunkan massacre: Members of the Liberation Tigers of Tamil Eelam, led by Uma Maheswaran, killed a team of four CID officers of the Sri Lanka Police, led by Inspector of Police T.L.B. Bastianpillai.
Carmen Franco, 1st Duchess of Franco, daughter of Francisco Franco, attempted to board a flight from Madrid–Barajas Airport to Lausanne, Switzerland, with a bag full of gold, jewelry and medals that had belonged to her father. She was accused of smuggling.
The Russian-owned cargo ship Astron ran aground off the coast of Punta Cana, Dominican Republic, while carrying corn to Cuba, spilling 7330 barrels of bunker fuel. The wreck is still in place and attracts underwater divers.
U.S. President Jimmy Carter decided to postpone production of the neutron bomb, a weapon that kills people with radiation, but leaves buildings relatively intact.
The first 13 rangers of the United States Bureau of Land Management were sworn in.
Born:
Jimmy Akingbola, British actor; in Plaistow, Newham, England
Bjørn Dahl, Norwegian footballer; in Bergen, Norway
Davor Dominiković, Croatian Olympic and professional handball player; in Metković, SR Croatia, SFR Yugoslavia
Gorka Fraile, Spanish tennis player; in Irun, Spain
Leire Iglesias, Spanish Olympic judoka; in Bilbao, Biscay, Spain
Duncan James, English singer
Lilia Osterloh, American tennis player; in Columbus, Ohio
Neil Roberts, Welsh footballer; in Wrexham, Wales
Marius Tincu, Romanian rugby union player; in Vânători, Iași, Romania
Vladimir Voltchkov, Belarusian tennis player; in Minsk, Byelorussian Soviet Socialist Republic, Soviet Union

April 8, 1978 (Saturday)
The 1978 Men's British Open Squash Championship concluded at the Wembley Squash Centre in London, England. Geoff Hunt defeated Qamar Zaman for the title.
The Troubles: 23-year-old Catholic civilian Brendan Megraw was abducted from his home in Belfast, Northern Ireland, by the Irish Republican Army. His remains were found on October 1, 2014, near Kells, County Meath.
In Saint Paul, Minnesota, Senator Muriel Humphrey announced that she would not run in the November election to fill the remaining four years of her late husband's term in the United States Senate. Senator Humphrey, the widow of Senator Hubert Humphrey, had been appointed to fill his Senate seat after his death on January 13.
Born:
Mathieu Assou-Ekotto, French footballer; in Sainte-Catherine, Pas-de-Calais, France
Nico Frommer, German footballer; in Ulm, West Germany
Bernt Haas, Swiss footballer; in Vienna, Austria
Nathan Mauger, New Zealand rugby union player; in Christchurch, New Zealand
Paola Núñez, Mexican actress and producer; in Tijuana, Baja California, Mexico
Mario Pestano, Spanish Olympic discus thrower; in Tenerife, Canary Islands, Spain
Rachel Roberts, Canadian model and actress; in Vancouver, British Columbia, Canada
Jocelyn Robichaud, Canadian tennis player; in Joliette, Quebec, Canada
Evans Rutto, Kenyan long-distance runner; in Marakwet District, Kenya
Anja Schneiderheinze, German Olympic champion bobsledder; in Erfurt, East Germany
Died:
Ford Frick, 83, American sportswriter and baseball executive
Lon L. Fuller, 75, American legal philosopher
Peter Igelhoff (born Rudolf August Ordnung), 73,  Austrian pianist, composer and entertainer
Gaston Leval (born Pierre Robert Piller), 82, French anarcho-syndicalist
Kurt Voß, 77, German international footballer

April 9, 1978 (Sunday)
38-year-old Lee Kam of Hong Kong poisoned her family's breakfast orange juice with cyanide, killing herself and her 8- and 9-year-old sons. Her 14-year-old daughter refused her mother's order to drink the juice and called the police. Lee Kam had been upset about marital problems.
1978 Somali coup d'état attempt: Somali military officers staged an unsuccessful coup against the government of Siad Barre. Security forces thwarted the attempt within hours, and several conspirators were arrested.
Hundred Days' War: Fighting took place between the Christian suburb of Ain el-Rummaneh and Muslim Chyah, Greater Beirut, Lebanon.

The Hebrew University of Jerusalem dedicated its Frank Sinatra International Student Center. Sinatra and his wife, Barbara Sinatra, were in attendance at the ceremony, as was actor Gregory Peck.
In Okahandja, South West Africa, over 10,000 members of the Herero people attended the burial of Chief Clemens Kapuuo, despite fears that the cemetery was mined. Kapuuo had been assassinated the previous week.
A fire discovered at about 12:30 am in an apartment house in Syracuse, New York, killed four members of the Syracuse Fire Department – Stanley Duda, Michael Petragnani, Frank Porpiglia Jr. and Robert Schuler – and injured two others. The four who died had been searching the building's attic for four people incorrectly rumored to be inside. This was the Syracuse Fire Department's greatest loss of life since the Collins Block fire in 1939, which killed nine firemen.
Five members of one family, including two children, died in a predawn tenement fire in Monticello, New York. Seven other people were injured.
Seven people, including five children, died in a predawn tenement fire in Lawrence, Massachusetts.
Walter Godefroot of Belgium won the 1978 Tour of Flanders classic cycle race.
The 1978 Masters Tournament concluded in Augusta, Georgia. Gary Player of South Africa won the championship.
Born:
Patricio Acevedo, Chilean-born Palestinian footballer; in Santiago, Chile
Kousei Amano (born Hironari Amano), Japanese actor; in Kasugai, Aichi, Japan
Jorge Andrade, Portuguese footballer; in Lisbon, Portugal
Dmitry Byakov, Kazakh footballer; in Almaty, Kazakh Soviet Socialist Republic, Soviet Union
Cameron Cartio (born Kamran Sabahi), Swedish pop singer and songwriter; in Tehran, Iran
Alex Gaumond, Canadian actor, singer and songwriter; in Montreal, Quebec, Canada
Naman Keïta, French Olympic track and field athlete; in Paris, France
Takashi Ōhara, Japanese voice actor; in Yokohama, Japan
Cristina Stahl, Romanian Olympic foil fencer; in Bucharest, Romania
Rachel Stevens, English singer; in Southgate, London, England
Artiom Tsepotan, Ukrainian chess International Master; in Kharkov, Ukrainian SSR, Soviet Union
Died:
René Carol (born Gerhard Tschierschnitz), 58, German Schlager singer
Vivian McGrath, 62, Australian tennis player
Sir Clough Williams-Ellis, CBE, MC, 94, Welsh architect, creator of Portmeirion
Elmer Woggon, 79, American comic strip artist

April 10, 1978 (Monday)
Hundred Days' War: Christian residents of Beirut, Lebanon, fought a half-hour gun battle with Syrian peacekeeping troops that began when mourners firing rifles into the air at a funeral procession began firing on the Syrians. The previous day's fighting between Ain el-Rummaneh and Chyah tapered off but killed two more people, for a total death toll of at least seven, including a 13-year-old girl.
The body of Baron Charles Bracht, a Belgian Olympic alpine skier and businessman, was found in a garbage dump in Oelegem, a suburb of Antwerp, Belgium. Bracht had been kidnapped in Antwerp on March 7.
A blackout in most of Quebec lasted for almost two hours, leaving over 1.5 million homes without power.
A three-way traffic collision in Clair-Mel City, Florida, killed the driver of a tank truck and injured two other motorists. A cloud of ammonia gas escaped from the overturned truck, forcing several hundred people to evacuate.

The Volkswagen Westmoreland Assembly plant near New Stanton, Pennsylvania was dedicated, having begun production of the Rabbit, the North American version of the Volkswagen Golf, the previous week. Volkswagen thus became the second non-American automobile manufacturer (after Rolls-Royce in 1921–1931) to open a plant in the United States. The plant closed in 1988.
The 1978 Family Circle Cup women's tennis tournament began on Hilton Head Island, South Carolina.
Born:
Eva Bramböck, Austrian Olympic triathlete; in Wörgl, Austria
Óscar Hernández, Spanish tennis player; in Barcelona, Spain
Katja Kettu (born Katja Maaria Heikkinen), Finnish author and film producer; in Muhos, Finland
Joe Pack, American Olympic freestyle skier; in Eugene, Oregon
Rustam Saparow, Turkmenistani footballer
Hana Šromová, Czech tennis player; in Kopřivnice, Czechoslovakia
Died:
Hjalmar Mäe, 76, Estonian politician
Albert Vollrat, 74, Estonian wrestler and football coach

April 11, 1978 (Tuesday)

Years of Lead (Italy): The Red Brigades ambushed and killed policeman Lorenzo Cutugno, a member of the Polizia Penitenziaria, in Turin, Italy.
At Palomar Observatory in California, astronomers Eleanor F. Helin, Gavril Grueff and Jasper V. Wall discovered the asteroid 3101 Goldberger. On the same day, at the Crimean Astrophysical Observatory, astronomer Nikolai Chernykh discovered the asteroid 4187 Shulnazaria.
Former National Basketball Association player John Brisker telephoned his girlfriend in Seattle, Washington, supposedly from Africa, where he had traveled to launch an import-export business. This was the last known communication with Brisker, who was declared legally dead in May 1985.
Born:
Marc Ange, Franco-Italian artist and designer; in Rome, Italy
Richard Bokatola, Congolese footballer; in Brazzaville, Republic of the Congo
Tom Caluwé, Belgian footballer, manager and executive; in Rumst, Belgium
Brett Claywell, American actor; in Greensboro, North Carolina
Ben Clymer, American professional ice hockey defenceman; in Edina, Minnesota
Prince Daye, Liberian footballer; in Monrovia, Liberia
David Ducourtioux, French footballer and manager; in Limoges, France
Marie Gaspard, French slalom canoeist; in Remiremont, France
Walter Guglielmone, Uruguayan footballer; in Salto, Uruguay
Josh Hancock, Major League Baseball pitcher; in Cleveland, Mississippi, (d. 2007)
Kevin Hulsmans, Belgian road bicycle racer; in Lommel, Belgium
Massimo Minetti, Italian footballer; in Genoa, Italy
Bechir Mogaadi, Tunisian footballer; in Sousse, Tunisia
Olena Olefirenko, Ukrainian Olympic rower; in Novoiavorivsk, Lviv Oblast, Ukrainian SSR, Soviet Union
Gabriele Paoletti, Italian footballer; in Rome, Italy
Ariel Rosada, Argentinean footballer; in Campana, Buenos Aires, Argentina
Ruy Bueno Neto, Brazilian footballer; in Belo Horizonte, Brazil
Victor Sikora, Dutch footballer; in Deventer, Netherlands
Died:
George C. Cory Jr., 57, American pianist and composer ("I Left My Heart in San Francisco"), suicide by drug overdose (b. 1920)
Ian MacDonald (born Ulva Pippy), 63, American actor and producer

April 12, 1978 (Wednesday)
The Supreme Soviet of Russia adopted the Russian Constitution of 1978.
The opera Le Grand Macabre, composed by György Ligeti, received its world premiere at the Königliche Oper Stockholm.
In a crime motivated by anti-black racism, Betty Gardner, a 33-year-old African American woman, was raped, tortured and murdered in Saint Helena Island, South Carolina. John Arnold and John Plath would be convicted of her murder in February 1979; both of them would be executed by lethal injection in 1998.
Born:
Stanislav Angelov, Bulgarian footballer; in Sofia, Bulgaria
Luca Argentero, Italian actor; in Turin, Italy
Guy Berryman, Scottish musician (Coldplay, Apparatjik); in Kirkcaldy, Scotland
Boey (born Cheeming Boey), Malaysian artist; in Singapore
John DeFilippo, National Football League coach; in Youngstown, Ohio
Svetlana Lapina, Russian Olympic high jumper; in Makhachkala, Dagestan Autonomous Soviet Socialist Republic, Russian SFSR, Soviet Union
Graham Little, Northern Irish television presenter and journalist
Linda Ogugua, Nigerian Olympic basketball player; in Anambra State, Nigeria
Christos Poyiatzis, Cypriot footballer and coach; in Famagusta, Cyprus
Andrés San Martín, Argentine footballer; in Lomas de Zamora, Buenos Aires Province, Argentina
Riley Smith, American actor; in Cedar Rapids, Iowa
Died: Betty Gardner, 33, American murder victim

April 13, 1978 (Thursday)
1978 Sikh–Nirankari clash at Amritsar, Punjab, India between traditional Sikhs and the Sant Nirankari Mission.
An early-morning attempted car bombing at the offices of ADEGUI (Asociación Democrática Empresarial de Guipúzcoa) in San Sebastián, Gipuzkoa, Spain, injured one of the perpetrators, who surrendered to French authorities after fleeing across the border.
The 1978 European Badminton Championships began in Preston, Lancashire, England.
Dirty War: Lawyer and Montoneros activist Eduardo Héctor Garat was kidnapped and "disappeared" on a street corner in Rosario, Santa Fe, Argentina.
Born:
Farrukh Amonatov, Tajikistani chess Grandmaster; in Dushanbe, Tajik Soviet Socialist Republic, Soviet Union
Arron Asham, Canadian professional ice hockey right winger; in Portage la Prairie, Manitoba, Canada
Kyle Howard, American television and movie actor; in Loveland, Colorado
Masamitsu Kobayashi, Japanese footballer; in Sano, Tochigi, Japan
Sylvie Meis, Dutch television personality and model; in Breda, Netherlands
Carles Puyol, Spanish Olympic and professional footballer; in La Pobla de Segur, Spain
Antoni Sivera, Andorran footballer
Raemon Sluiter, Dutch professional tennis player and coach; in Rotterdam, Netherlands
Vladimir Smirnov, Lithuanian cyclist; in Klaipėda, Lithuanian SSR, Soviet Union
Alexander Voigt, German footballer and manager; in Cologne, West Germany
Died:
Ernst Bantle, 77, German international footballer
Jack Chambers, 47, Canadian artist and filmmaker
Paul McGrath, 74, American actor
Funmilayo Ransome-Kuti, 77, Nigerian suffragist and women's rights activist; injuries from 1977 assault by government soldiers
William Rees-Thomas CB FRCP FRSM, 90, Welsh psychiatrist

April 14, 1978 (Friday)
1978 Tongan general election.
1978 Georgian demonstrations: Thousands of Georgians demonstrated in Tbilisi against an attempt by Soviet authorities to change the constitutional status of the Georgian language. April 14 is now celebrated as the Day of the Georgian Language.
In Rhodesia, nine black ministers were sworn in to serve on the Ministerial Council of the Transitional Government.
Abel Mthembu, former deputy president of the African National Congress in the Transvaal, was murdered after turning state witness at the Pretoria ANC trial.
The Troubles: 61-year-old Protestant James McKee, a member of the Ulster Defence Regiment, was shot and killed by the Irish Republican Army while off duty and driving a school bus in Creggan, County Tyrone, Northern Ireland. On the same day, 27-year-old Protestant civilian Robert McCullough was shot and killed by the Ulster Volunteer Force at his home in Newtownabbey, County Antrim, Northern Ireland.
Born:
Tony Bombardieri, Italian Olympic figure skater; in Bergamo, Province of Bergamo, Italy
Sorin Botiș, Romanian footballer; in Arad, Romania
Georgina Harland, British Olympic modern pentathlete; in Canterbury, Kent, England
Louisy Joseph (born Lydy Louisy-Joseph), French singer; in Vénissieux, Lyon Metropolis, France
Roland Lessing, Estonian Olympic biathlete; in Tartu, Soviet-occupied Estonia
Kaori Muraji, Japanese classical guitarist; in Tokyo, Japan
Toni Söderholm, Finnish ice hockey defenceman and coach; in Kauniainen, Finland
Died:
Joe Gordon, 63, Major League Baseball second baseman, coach and manager
Thomas Hollingdale AKC, 77, Wales international rugby player and Church of England cleric
F. R. Leavis , 82, English literary critic
Arline Pretty, 92, American silent film actress
Mauk Weber, 64, Dutch footballer

April 15, 1978 (Saturday)

In the Province of Bologna, Italy, the Murazze di Vado train disaster killed 48 people and injured 117.
The 1978 European Badminton Championships concluded in Preston, Lancashire. England won three of the events, with Denmark winning two.
The Troubles: 57-year-old Protestant John Moore of the Royal Ulster Constabulary was killed while off duty by an Irish Republican Army bomb attached to his car in Armoy, County Antrim, Northern Ireland.
Robert F. Kennedy Jr. was slightly injured and hospitalized after diving from a pier into shallow water in Point Clear, Alabama. Kennedy was released from the Mobile Infirmary after being observed overnight.
Born:
Susanne Alt, German jazz saxophone player and composer; in Würzburg, West Germany
Austin Aries (born Daniel Healy Solwold Jr.), American professional wrestler; in Milwaukee, Wisconsin
Milton Bradley, Major League Baseball outfielder; in Harbor City, Los Angeles, California
Tim Corcoran, Major League Baseball pitcher; in Baton Rouge, Louisiana
Helena Costa, Portuguese football manager; in Alhandra, São João dos Montes e Calhandriz, Vila Franca de Xira, Portugal
Soumaïla Coulibaly, Malian footballer; in Bamako, Mali
Luis Fonsi, Puerto Rican singer and songwriter; in San Juan, Puerto Rico
Travis Hansen, National Basketball Association player; in Provo, Utah
Giorgi Latso (born Giorgi Latsabidze), Georgian-American concert pianist and composer; in Tbilisi, Georgian Soviet Socialist Republic, Soviet Union
Chris Stapleton, American country singer and guitarist; in Lexington, Kentucky
Died: Frank Tallman, 58, American stunt pilot; in a plane crash

April 16, 1978 (Sunday)
The Khaleej Times, the first English-language daily newspaper in the United Arab Emirates, began publication.
Francesco Moser of Italy won the 1978 Paris–Roubaix cycle race.
Chris Evert won the singles title at the 1978 Family Circle Cup tennis tournament.
Born:
An Hyo-yeon, South Korean footballer; in Incheon, South Korea
Lucie Borhyová, Czech television presenter; in Prague, Czechoslovakia
Alex Brown, Liberian footballer
Arnaud Casquette, Mauritian Olympic long jumper
Adnan Čustović, Bosnian footballer and manager; in Mostar, Socialist Republic of Bosnia and Herzegovina, SFR Yugoslavia
Boyd Devereaux, Canadian professional ice hockey centre; in Seaforth, Ontario, Canada
Lara Dutta, Indian actress, Miss Universe 2000; in Ghaziabad, Uttar Pradesh, India
Matthew Lloyd, Australian rules footballer; in Melbourne, Victoria, Australia
Hailu Negussie, Ethiopian marathon runner
Noam Okun, Israeli professional tennis player; in Haifa, Israel
Kristin Proctor, American actress; in Los Angeles, California
Yelena Prokhorova, Russian Olympic heptathlete; in Kemerovo, Kemerovo Oblast, Russian SFSR, Soviet Union
Igor Tudor, Croatian footballer and coach; in Split, SR Croatia, SFR Yugoslavia
Ivan Urgant, Russian television host, actor and musician; in Leningrad, Russian SFSR, Soviet Union
Died:
Francis X. Bushman Jr., c. 75, American actor
Lucius D. Clay, 79, American military governor of Germany after World War II
Nagamichi Kuroda, 88, Japanese ornithologist
Richard Lindner, 76, German-American painter
Eddie Morgan, 64, Wales international rugby player
John Sines, 63, American professional basketball player
Philibert Tsiranana, 65, Malagasy leader and politician, 1st President of Madagascar

April 17, 1978 (Monday)
The 1978 World Snooker Championship began at the Crucible Theatre in Sheffield, England.
Born:
Monika Bergmann-Schmuderer (born Monika Bergmann), German Olympic alpine skier; in Lam, Bavaria, West Germany
Juan Guillermo Castillo, Uruguayan footballer; in Montevideo, Uruguay
Felipe Reinaldo da Silva, Brazilian footballer; in Ernestina, Rio Grande do Sul, Brazil
Daniel Hensel, German composer, VJ and musicologist; in Büdingen, West Germany
Lindsay Korman, American actress; in Palm Springs, California
Henry Lapczyk, Paraguayan footballer and coach; in Fernando de la Mora, Paraguay
Loukas Louka, Cypriot footballer; in Larnaca, Cyprus
Hannu Manninen, Finnish Olympic champion Nordic combined athlete; in Rovaniemi, Finland
Maylana Martin, Women's National Basketball Association player; in Honolulu, Hawaii
David Murdoch, Scottish Olympic curler; in Dumfries, Scotland
Arild Sundgot, Norwegian footballer; in Ulsteinvik, Norway
Jason White, Scottish rugby union player; in Edinburgh, Scotland
Anna Wielebnowska, Polish Olympic basketball player; in Kraków, Kraków Voivodeship, Poland
Satoshi Yamaguchi, Japanese footballer; in Sakawa, Kōchi, Japan
Died:
Ewald Balser, 79, German film actor
Mir Akbar Khyber, 53, Afghan communist politician; assassinated

April 18, 1978 (Tuesday)
The United States Senate voted, 68–32, to ratify the Panama Canal Treaty, agreeing to turn the Panama Canal over to Panamanian control on December 31, 1999.
Born:
Dias Caires (born Yahenda Joaquim Caires Fernandes), Angolan footballer
Dedé (born Leonardo de Deus Santos), Brazilian footballer; in Belo Horizonte, Brazil
Ryan Gardner, Canadian-born Swiss professional ice hockey forward; in Toronto, Ontario, Canada
Mehdi Leroy, French footballer; in Saint-Nazaire, France
Malcolm Licari, Maltese footballer; in Pietà, Malta
Baran bo Odar, German film and television director and screenwriter; in Olten, Switzerland
Luciano Pagliarini, Brazilian Olympic cyclist; in Arapongas, Paraná, Brazil
Maxim Podoprigora, Austrian Olympic swimmer; in Kiev, Ukrainian SSR, Soviet Union
Vanja Rupena, Croatian model; in Koper, Socialist Republic of Slovenia, SFR Yugoslavia
Ryōta Tsuzuki, Japanese Olympic and professional footballer; in Heguri, Nara, Japan
Died:
Rudolf Bonnet, 83, Dutch artist
Katherine Schmidt, 79, American artist

April 19, 1978 (Wednesday)
The Ninth Knesset held the 1978 Israeli presidential election. Yitzhak Navon ran unopposed for the position and became the fifth President of Israel.
The Uzbek Soviet Socialist Republic adopted a new constitution.
The 1978 Rallye de Portugal (12º Rallye de Portugal - Vinho do Porto) began.
Hundreds of people rallied at the Minnesota State Capitol in Saint Paul against the proposed repeal of the gay rights provision in the city's human rights ordinance.
Born:
Gorka Brit, Spanish footballer; in San Sebastián, Gipuzkoa, Spain
Giulia Casoni, Italian tennis player; in Ferrara, Italy
James Franco, American actor; in Palo Alto, California
Gabriel Heinze, Argentinean footballer; in Crespo, Entre Ríos, Argentina
Jeanne Herry, French filmmaker and actress
Amber Lawrence, Australian country music singer-songwriter; in Mascot, New South Wales, Australia
Dorothee Mantel, German politician; in Bamberg, West Germany
Flavio Medina, Mexican actor; in Mexico City, Mexico
Geordan Murphy, Irish rugby union player and coach; in Dublin, Ireland
Amanda Sage, American painter; in Denver, Colorado
Died: Joe Dougherty, 79, American voice actor, original voice of Porky Pig

April 20, 1978 (Thursday)

A Soviet air defense plane shot down Korean Air Lines Flight 902; the plane made an emergency landing on a frozen lake, killing two passengers.
Years of Lead (Italy): The Red Brigades killed policeman Francesco Di Cataldo in Crescenzago, Milan, Italy.
Michel Laurent of France won the 1978 La Flèche Wallonne cycle race.
The 1978 Atlantic Coast Conference baseball tournament began at Beautiful Tiger Field in Clemson, South Carolina.
Around 150 people attended a debate in the Great Hall of Cooper Union, at which graphic designer Massimo Vignelli and cartographer John Tauranac discussed their proposed designs for the map of New York City's subway system. A version of Tauranac's map was adopted in 1979 and is still in use.
Born:
Chrysta Bell (born Chrysta Bell Zucht), American singer and actress; in San Antonio, Texas
Clayne Crawford (born Joseph Crawford), American actor; in Clay, Alabama
Mathew Hayman, Australian road bicycle racer; in Camperdown, New South Wales, Australia
David Karanka, Spanish footballer; in Vitoria-Gasteiz, Álava, Spain
Lauri Pyykönen, Finnish Olympic cross-country skier; in Pirkkala, Finland
Alessandro Rigotti, Italian voice actor; in Turin, Italy
Carlos Rodríguez, Venezuelan Olympic fencer
David Sánchez, Spanish tennis player; in Zamora, Spain
Kunihiko Takizawa, Japanese footballer; in Fuchū, Tokyo, Japan
Edvaldo Valério, Brazilian Olympic swimmer; in Salvador, Bahia, Brazil
Stefan Wächter, German footballer and coach; in Herne, North Rhine-Westphalia, West Germany
Died:
Jean Babelon, 89, French librarian, historian and numismatist
Ferdinand Peroutka, 83, Czech journalist and writer

April 21, 1978 (Friday)
The Azerbaijan Soviet Socialist Republic adopted a new Constitution.
Born:
Glen Berry, British actor; in Romford, England
Jacob Burns, Australian football (soccer) player; in Sydney, Australia
Ricardo Fernandes, Portuguese footballer; in Moreira de Cónegos, Portugal
Jukka Nevalainen, Finnish drummer (Nightwish); in Kitee, Finland
Paleface (born Karri Pekka Matias Miettinen), Finnish hip hop musician; in Järvenpää, Finland
Yuliya Pechonkina, Russian Olympic track and field athlete; in Krasnoyarsk, Krasnoyarsk Krai, Russian SFSR, Soviet Union
Matteo Serafini, Italian footballer and coach; in Brescia, Italy
Branden Steineckert, American drummer (Rancid, The Used); in Pocatello, Idaho
Died:
Sandy Denny, 31, British singer-songwriter, head injury and intracerebral hemorrhage
Robert de Nesle, 71, French film producer
Thomas Wyatt Turner, PhD, 101, American civil rights activist, biologist and educator

April 22, 1978 (Saturday)
Izhar Cohen & The Alphabeta won the Eurovision Song Contest 1978 for Israel with their song "A-Ba-Ni-Bi".
The Troubles: 36-year-old Protestant Millar McAllister of the Royal Ulster Constabulary was shot and killed while off duty by the Irish Republican Army at his home in Lisburn, County Antrim, Northern Ireland.
The One Love Peace Concert was held at The National Stadium in Kingston, Jamaica. Bob Marley united two opposing political leaders, Michael Manley and Edward Seaga, at this concert, attempting to bring peace to the civil war-ridden streets of the city.

In Findlay, Ohio, teenagers Michael D. Armstrong and Troy Lee Best drowned while canoeing on the Blanchard River. Two Findlay firefighters, Roland G. Smith Jr. and William C. VanAtta, both veterans of the Vietnam War, died attempting to rescue the boys when a rescue rowboat capsized. A third firefighter survived.
Born:
Jagoba Arrasate, Spanish footballer and manager; in Berriatua, Biscay, Spain
Ida Auken, Danish priest and politician; in Frederiksberg, Denmark
Stacy Clinesmith, Women's National Basketball Association player; in Spokane, Washington
DJ Drama (born Tyree Cinque Simmons), American DJ, record executive and music promoter; in Philadelphia, Pennsylvania
Pedro Duarte, Portuguese footballer; in Setúbal, Portugal
Aaron Fink, American guitarist (Breaking Benjamin); in Wilkes-Barre, Pennsylvania
Manu Intiraymi, American actor; in Santa Cruz, California
Ezekiel Jackson (born Rycklon Ezekiel Stephens), Guyanese-American professional wrestler and bodybuilder; in Linden, Guyana
Tamicha Jackson, Women's National Basketball Association player; in Dallas, Texas
Hayrulla Karimov, Uzbek international footballer; in Namangan, Uzbek SSR, Soviet Union
Paul Malakwen Kosgei, Kenyan long-distance and marathon runner; in Marakwet District, Kenya
Kamila Rajdlová, Czech Olympic cross-country skier; in Liberec, Czechoslovakia
Penny Tai, Malaysian singer, songwriter and producer; in Segamat, Johor, Malaysia
Esteban Tuero, Argentine Formula One driver; in Buenos Aires, Argentina
Died:
Basil Dean CBE, 89,  English actor, writer and film and theatrical producer/director
Will Geer, 76, American actor, musician and social activist
Varvara Myasnikova, 77, Soviet Russian actress

April 23, 1978 (Sunday)
Joseph Bruyère of Belgium won the 1978 Liège–Bastogne–Liège cycle race.
Finnish driver Markku Alén and co-driver Ilkka Kivimäki won the 1978 Rallye de Portugal.
A car bomb planted by rival mobsters killed Rochester, New York, mobster Salvatore "Sammy G" Gingello.
Born:
Kofi Amponsah, Ghanaian footballer; in Accra, Ghana
Ian Brennan, American screenwriter, director and actor, co-creator of Glee; in Mount Prospect, Illinois
Tamara Czartoryska, Spanish sportswoman, model and television personality; in London, England
Antônio Géder, Brazilian footballer; in Recreio, Brazil
Gezahegne Abera, Ethiopian Olympic champion marathon runner; in Etya, Arsi Province, Ethiopia
Papy Lukata Shumu, Congolese footballer; in Kinshasa, Zaire
Marcel Kimemba Mbayo, Congolese footballer; in Lubumbashi, Zaire
Brian Mullan, American soccer player; in Mineola, New York
Nicholas Murphy, Irish Cork Gaelic footballer; in Carrigaline, County Cork, Ireland
Saori Obata, Japanese tennis player; in Tokyo, Japan
Inti Podestá, Uruguayan footballer; in Montevideo, Uruguay
Died:
Christian Lattier, 52, Ivorian sculptor
Ivan Pereverzev, 63, Soviet actor
Jacques Rueff, 81, French economist and adviser to the Government of France
Teo Soon Kim, 73, Singaporean barrister, first woman admitted to the Straits Settlements bar

April 24, 1978 (Monday)
1978 Prince Edward Island general election.
The Clemson Tigers won the 1978 Atlantic Coast Conference Baseball Tournament.
Born:
Patrice Beaumelle, French footballer and coach; in Arles, France
Willy Blain, French Olympic and professional boxer; in Le Tampon, Réunion, France
Jesper Christiansen, Danish footballer and coach; in Roskilde, Denmark
Jimmy Coogan, Irish Kilkenny hurler; in Tullaroan, County Kilkenny, Ireland
Stella Damasus, Nigerian actress and singer; in Benin City, Nigeria
Libor Došek, Czech Olympic and professional footballer; in Brno, Czechoslovakia
Petr Lukáš, Czech footballer; in Prague, Czechoslovakia
Matt Nagy, Arena Football League quarterback and National Football League head coach; in Dunellen, New Jersey
Kazunari Okayama, Japanese footballer; in Sakai, Osaka Prefecture, Japan
Diego Quintana, Argentine footballer; in Rosario, Santa Fe, Argentina
Ronny Scholz, German road racing cyclist; in Forst (Lausitz), Bezirk Cottbus, East Germany
Beth Storry, English Olympic field hockey player; in Reading, Berkshire, England
Jiří Vaněk, Czech professional tennis player and coach; in Domažlice, Czechoslovakia
Died:
Hunk Anderson (born Heartley William Anderson), 79, American football player and coach
Federico Chávez, c. 96 (birth year seems to be doubtful), Paraguayan politician and soldier

April 25, 1978 (Tuesday)
The 1978 Vuelta a España bicycle stage race began in Gijón, Spain. It would continue through May 14.

The Phillie Phanatic, mascot of the Philadelphia Phillies Major League Baseball team, made his on-field debut at Veterans Stadium during a home game against the Chicago Cubs. The creature had made his first public appearance on April 23, on an episode of the local children's TV show Captain Noah and His Magical Ark.
In Kansas City, Missouri, a group of home invaders fatally shot three people in their 20s. A fourth victim, Cynthia Douglas, survived by pretending to be dead. Douglas would make multiple attempts prior to her death in 2015 to recant her identification of Kevin Strickland, one of three men convicted of the crime, who became the subject of extensive efforts to have him released as wrongfully convicted. Strickland's conviction was set aside and all criminal counts against him dismissed on November 23, 2021; he had spent 43 years in prison.
Saint Paul, Minnesota, voters repealed a provision in the city's human rights ordinance that protected gays and lesbians from discrimination. The ordinance was repealed by a 2-to-1 margin. Saint Paul was the second U.S. city to repeal its gay rights ordinance, after Anita Bryant's successful 1977 anti-gay campaign in Dade County, Florida.
Two men abducted, beat, tortured and murdered Constable Thomas Brian King of the Royal Canadian Mounted Police, then dumped his body in the Saskatchewan River.
Born:
Bart Deelkens, Belgian footballer; in Hasselt, Belgium
Malalai Joya, Afghan activist, writer and politician; in Ziken, Farah Province, Afghanistan
Duncan Kibet, Kenyan marathon runner
Jesús María Lacruz, Spanish footballer; in Pamplona, Navarre, Spain
Jean-Michel Lucenay, French Olympic champion épée fencer; in Fort-de-France, Martinique, France
Hamchétou Maïga, Malian Olympic and professional basketball player; in Bamako, Mali
Sya Styles (born Rachid Aït Baar), French DJ (Psy 4 de la Rime); in Marseilles, France (d. 2015)
Fabian Wagner, German cinematographer; in Munich, West Germany
Matt Walker, British Paralympic swimmer; in Stockport, England
Died:
Harry Griffiths, 47, Welsh footballer and manager
Lee Kim Lai, 18, while serving his national service with the Singapore Police Force, was abducted from the police unit at Mount Vernon, Singapore, forced into a taxi and murdered for his service revolver. The taxi driver was also murdered.
Eero Liives, 86, Estonian composer and violinist
Zenta Mauriņa, 80, Latvian writer, essayist and philologist
Peng Shaohui, 71, Chinese People's Liberation Army general
Arne Rustadstuen, 72, Norwegian Olympic skier

April 26, 1978 (Wednesday)
Years of Lead (Italy): Members of the Red Brigades shot a Christian Democrat politician in the legs in Rome.
The 1978 Ice Hockey World Championships began in Prague, Czechoslovakia. They would continue through May 14.
In the first leg of the 1978 UEFA Cup Final, played at Stade Furiani in Corsica, France, SC Bastia and PSV Eindhoven played to a goalless draw. Jacques Tati directed a film, Forza Bastia, documenting the match.
The bodies of four of the men were eventually recovered.
Classical ballet dancer Mikhail Baryshnikov announced that he would leave the American Ballet Theatre when its season ended on June 10 to join the New York City Ballet. Baryshnikov said the move was due to his desire to work with choreographer George Balanchine.
Born:
Hiroshi Asai, Japanese musician; in Okayama, Japan
Avant (born Myron Lavell Avant), American contemporary R&B singer and songwriter; in Cleveland, Ohio
Elson Becerra, Colombian footballer; in Cartagena, Colombia (d. 2006, shot)
Markus Hipfl, Austrian professional tennis player; in Wels, Austria
Stana Katic, Canadian-American actress; in Hamilton, Ontario, Canada
Peter Madsen, Danish footballer; in Roskilde, Denmark
Dmitry Mamonov, Kazakhstani footballer and manager; in Taldıqorğan, Kazakh SSR, Soviet Union
Jamie McAllister, Scottish footballer; in Glasgow, Scotland
Andrés Mendoza, Peruvian footballer; in Chincha Alta, Peru
Rachel Morrison, American cinematographer and director; in Cambridge, Massachusetts
Anna Mouglalis, French actress and model; in Nantes, Loire-Atlantique, France
Pablo Schreiber, Canadian-American actor; in Ymir, British Columbia, Canada
Shinnosuke Tachibana, Japanese voice actor; in Gifu, Gifu Prefecture, Japan
Charly Wegelius, British professional road racing cyclist; in Espoo, Finland
Stephen Williams, Jamaican-Canadian film and television director
Died:
Ottavio Alessi, 59, Italian screenwriter, producer and film director
Nino Valeri, 80, Italian historian

April 27, 1978 (Thursday)
Saur Revolution: A Marxist military coup d'état began in Afghanistan, during which President Mohammed Daoud Khan would be killed and his family murdered. Nur Muhammad Taraki succeeded him, beginning the Afghan Civil War which as of 2022 has not yet ended.
Danish welterweight boxer Jørgen Hansen defeated Alain Maron for the European Boxing Union Welterweight Title in a bout held in Randers, Denmark.
Václav Havel and others founded the Committee for the Defense of the Unjustly Prosecuted (VONS), a Czechoslovak dissident organization.
Years of Lead (Italy):
In a Red Brigades ambush, two men and a woman shot Fiat executive Sergio Palmieri in the legs as he walked to a bus stop in Turin, Italy.
18-year-old Giovanna Amati, a future Formula One driver, was ransomed by her father for 800 million Italian lire from kidnappers who had threatened to rape her and send her father a recording of the crime. Amati had been kept chained in a wooden box for two and a half months. Her father, a movie theater chain owner, paid part of the ransom with box office receipts from the film Star Wars. His wife sold some of her jewelry and borrowed her servants' life savings.
Actor John Wayne was discharged from Massachusetts General Hospital in Boston, Massachusetts, after undergoing heart surgery.
David A. Kennedy, a son of Robert F. Kennedy, was hospitalized in intensive care at Massachusetts General Hospital.
In response to a petition filed the previous year by the Health Research Group, an organization affiliated with Ralph Nader, the U.S. Consumer Product Safety Commission voted unanimously to ban benzene. The Health Research Group criticized the commission's delay in imposing the ban, saying that it had caused new cases of leukemia.
Willow Island disaster: In the deadliest construction accident in United States history, 51 construction workers were killed when a cooling tower under construction collapsed at the Pleasants Power Station in Willow Island, West Virginia.
John Ehrlichman, a former aide to U.S. President Richard Nixon, was released from the Federal Correctional Institution, Safford, Arizona, after serving 18 months for Watergate-related crimes.
Born:
Carlos Andrade, Portuguese professional basketball player; in Sal, Cape Verde
Pinar Atalay, German radio and television presenter; in Lemgo, West Germany
Sami Hinkka, Finnish heavy metal bass player (Rapture, Ensiferum)
Jakub Janda, Czech Olympic ski jumper and politician; in Čeladná, Czechoslovakia
Knut Dørum Lillebakk, Norwegian footballer
Fredrik Neij, Swedish hacker
Sebastián Ariel Romero, Argentinean footballer; in Berisso, Greater La Plata, Argentina
Takahiro Suzuki, Japanese professional baseball player; in Sōma, Fukushima, Japan
Oumar Timbo, Mauritanian footballer
Remmert Wielinga, Dutch professional road bicycle racer; in Eindhoven, Netherlands
Died:
Ralston Crawford, 71, American abstract painter, lithographer and photographer
John Doeg, 69, American tennis player
Guido Stampacchia, 56, Italian mathematician (b. 1922)

April 28, 1978 (Friday)

Saur Revolution: On the morning of April 28, rebel soldiers surrounded the Arg, the presidential palace in Kabul, Afghanistan, and demanded the surrender of Afghan President Mohammed Daoud Khan and his brother Naim Khan. The two men charged the soldiers with pistols and were shot to death.
Born:
José Adrián Bonilla, Costa Rican professional and Olympic road bicycle racer; in Paraíso, Costa Rica
Germain Katanga, Congolese war criminal; in Mambasa, Mambasa Territory, Ituri District, Zaire
Lauren Laverne, English radio DJ, television presenter, author and singer (Kenickie); in Sunderland, Tyne and Wear, England
Robert Oliveri, American former child actor; in Los Angeles, California
Fernando Rapallini, Argentine football referee; in La Plata, Argentina
Nate Richert, American actor, director and musician; in Saint Paul, Minnesota
Drew Scott, Canadian reality television personality; in Vancouver, British Columbia, Canada
Jonathan Scott, Canadian reality television personality, identical twin brother of Drew Scott; in Vancouver, British Columbia, Canada
Died:
Mohammed Daoud Khan, President of Afghanistan, 68, assassinated
Roman Karmen, 71, Soviet war photographer, cinematographer and documentary film director
Evan Klamer, 55, Danish Olympic cyclist
Curt McMahon, 63, American professional basketball player
Russell Metty, 71, American cinematographer
Sir Philip Neame, 89, British Army officer and Olympic champion sport shooter; only winner of both an Olympic gold medal and the Victoria Cross
Ghulam Haidar Rasuli, Afghan major general; assassinated

April 29, 1978 (Saturday)
The 1978 World Snooker Championship concluded at the Crucible Theatre in Sheffield, England. Ray Reardon defeated Perrie Mans in the final, becoming the oldest snooker world champion.
The 1978 Pontins Professional snooker tournament began in Prestatyn, Wales. It would continue through May 6.
The Miss USA 1978 pageant took place at the Gillard Municipal Auditorium in Charleston, South Carolina. Miss Hawaii USA, Judi Andersen, won the pageant and went on to be first runner-up at Miss Universe 1978 on July 24.
Born:
Masoud Haji Akhondzadeh, Iranian Olympic judoka; in Mashhad, Iran
Tony Armas Jr., Venezuelan Major League Baseball pitcher; in Puerto Píritu, Anzoátegui, Venezuela
Bob and Mike Bryan, American doubles tennis team; in Camarillo, California
Javier Colon, American singer-songwriter; in Stratford, Connecticut
Neil Doyle, Irish international football referee; in Dundrum, Dublin, Ireland
Facundo (born Facundo Gómez Brueda), Mexican television presenter; in Mexico City, Mexico
Craig Gower, Australian rugby league and rugby union player; in Penrith, New South Wales, Australia
Jason Hart, National Basketball Association player; in Los Angeles, California
Sam Jones, American professional basketball player and coach; in Chicago, Illinois
Niko Kapanen, Finnish professional and Olympic ice hockey centre; in Hattula, Finland
Tyler Labine, Canadian actor; in Brampton, Ontario, Canada
Donna Loffhagen, New Zealand netball and Olympic basketball player; in Christchurch, New Zealand
David O'Loughlin, Irish professional and Olympic cyclist; in Cong, County Mayo, Ireland
Železník, Czechoslovak racehorse; in Šamorín, Czechoslovakia (d. 2004)
Died:
Theo Helfrich, 64, German racing driver
Abdul Qadir Nuristani, Interior Minister of Afghanistan; assassinated (birthdate not known)
Giacomo Vaghi, 76, Italian operatic bass
Yukihiko Yasuda, 94, Japanese painter

April 30, 1978 (Sunday)
Saur Revolution: The Marxist "Democratic Republic of Afghanistan" was proclaimed, under pro-communist leader Nur Muhammad Taraki.
Born:
Simone Barone, Italian footballer and manager; in Nocera Inferiore, Italy
Joachim Boldsen, Danish Olympic team handball player; in Helsingør, Denmark
Alice Canepa, Italian tennis player; in Finale Ligure, Italy
Sandra Hüller, German actress; in Suhl, East Germany
Emily McInerny, Australian basketball player; in Bendigo, Victoria, Australia
Rose Rollins, American actress and model; in Berkeley, California
Died: Liane Augustin, 50, German Austrian singer and actress

References

April 1978 events
1978-04
1978-04
1978